Burgener is a surname. Notable people with the surname include:

Alexander Burgener (1845–1910), Swiss mountain guide, first ascentionist of many mountains in the western Alps
Casey Burgener (born 1982), American weightlifter
Clair Burgener (1921–2006), American Republican politician, member of the U.S. House of Representatives 1973–1983
Erich Burgener (born 1951), football goalkeeper
Hans Burgener (born 1964), Swiss wheelchair curler
Jocelyn Burgenern (born 1949), Canadian politician

Surnames
German-language surnames
Surnames of German origin
Surnames of Swiss origin